"Bring Me to Life" is a song by the rock band Thousand Foot Krutch on their album Welcome to the Masquerade. It was released as a single on April 22, 2009. Thousand Foot Krutch were part of around 100 bands participated in Taco Bell's "Feed the Beat" competition, where they competed for a chance to record a single and have Taco Bell produce it and gain valuable marketing support for that single.

Release and reception
"Bring Me to Life" was released via digital download and to radio stations on April 22, 2009, it peaked at number 2 on Christian rock radio on September 10, 2009. It was also well received with heavy iTunes sales and was for a limited time available for free legal download off feedthebeat.com.

Style
The song features a keyboard, which is a new entry for Thousand Foot Krutch as they had previously only experimented with it on slower songs, with the keyboard used for both the intro and the bridge. The lyrics are both rapped and sung. The song itself appears to be influenced by bands such as Korn and Evanescence, as well as the band's own nu metal and rap rock roots.

Personnel 
 Trevor McNevan - vocals, guitars
 Joel Bruyere - bass
 Steve Augustine - drums
 Aaron Sprinkle - keyboards

Awards
The song was nominated for "Rock Recorded Song of the Year" at the 41st GMA Dove Awards.

References

2009 singles
Thousand Foot Krutch songs
2009 songs
Tooth & Nail Records singles
Songs written by Trevor McNevan
Nu metal songs